The posterior scrotal arteries are branches of the internal pudendal artery.

Function 
The anterior scrotal arteries supply part of the scrotum in men.

See also 

 Anterior scrotal arteries

References

Arteries of the abdomen
Scrotum